Baeten is a surname. Notable people with the surname include:

René Baeten (1927–1960), Belgian motocross racer
Thibo Baeten (born 2002), Belgian footballer

See also 
John Baeten Store, Commercial building on the National Register of Historic Places in Wisconsin
Baetens (disambiguation)